In probability theory and statistics, the normal-gamma distribution (or Gaussian-gamma distribution) is a bivariate four-parameter family of continuous probability distributions. It is the conjugate prior of a normal distribution with unknown mean and precision.

Definition
For a pair of random variables, (X,T), suppose that the conditional distribution of X given T is given by

meaning that the conditional distribution is a normal distribution with mean  and precision  — equivalently, with variance 

Suppose also that the marginal distribution of T is given by

where this means that  T has a gamma distribution. Here λ, α and β are parameters of the joint distribution.

Then  (X,T) has a normal-gamma distribution, and this is denoted by

Properties

Probability density function

The joint probability density function of (X,T) is

Marginal distributions

Exponential family

The normal-gamma distribution is a four-parameter exponential family with natural parameters  and natural statistics .

Moments of the natural statistics
The following moments can be easily computed using the moment generating function of the sufficient statistic:

where  is the digamma function,

Scaling

If  then for any  is distributed as

Posterior distribution of the parameters 
Assume that x is distributed according to a normal distribution with unknown mean  and precision .

for which the density  satisfies

Suppose

 

where  is the likelihood of the parameters given the data.

Since the data are i.i.d, the likelihood of the entire dataset is equal to the product of the likelihoods of the individual data samples:

This expression can be simplified as follows:

The posterior distribution of the parameters is proportional to the prior times the likelihood.

The final exponential term is simplified by completing the square.

On inserting this back into the expression above,

This final expression is in exactly the same form as a Normal-Gamma distribution, i.e.,

Interpretation of parameters 

The interpretation of parameters in terms of pseudo-observations is as follows:
The new mean takes a weighted average of the old pseudo-mean and the observed mean, weighted by the number of associated (pseudo-)observations.
The precision was estimated from  pseudo-observations (i.e. possibly a different number of pseudo-observations, to allow the variance of the mean and precision to be controlled separately) with sample mean  and sample variance  (i.e. with sum of squared deviations ).
The posterior updates the number of pseudo-observations simply by adding up the corresponding number of new observations.
The new sum of squared deviations is computed by adding the previous respective sums of squared deviations.  However, a third "interaction term" is needed because the two sets of squared deviations were computed with respect to different means, and hence the sum of the two underestimates the actual total squared deviation.

and after observing  samples with mean  and variance , the posterior probability is

Generating normal-gamma random variates 
Generation of random variates is straightforward:
 Sample  from a gamma distribution with parameters  and 
 Sample  from a normal distribution with mean  and variance

Related distributions 
 The normal-inverse-gamma distribution is essentially the same distribution parameterized by variance rather than precision
 The normal-exponential-gamma distribution

Notes

References 
  Bernardo, J.M.; Smith, A.F.M. (1993) Bayesian Theory, Wiley. 
  Dearden et al. "Bayesian Q-learning", Proceedings of the Fifteenth National Conference on Artificial Intelligence (AAAI-98), July 26–30, 1998, Madison, Wisconsin, USA.

Multivariate continuous distributions
Conjugate prior distributions
Normal distribution